Elia is a sculpture created by Ingvar Cronhammar (1947–2021) in Herning, Denmark. It is a large, spherical dome with four columns reaching . A large tube located in the center of the sculpture randomly blasts flames  into the air, for about 25 seconds at a time. These random bursts can occur anytime in periods of about two months and will not occur if it is too windy or if people are too close. The work was inaugurated in September 2001 and cost 23 million Danish krone.

Accidents
On 30 October 2016 a 21-year-old man died by falling down the center. 2 months later, on 29 December 2016, a woman died the same way, purportedly committing suicide by jumping into the centre chamber.
This ultimately resulted in the sculpture getting a safety net installed. In connection with the installation of the net, an installer fell several meters down and subsequently had to be taken to hospital by ambulance. On 23 March 2021, a 46-year-old man died in one of the four steel pipes while performing maintenance on the sculpture.

Dimensions and materials
The sculpture has the following dimensions and material use:

References

External links

 Elia Homepage

Outdoor sculptures in Denmark
2001 sculptures
Buildings and structures completed in 2001
Steel sculptures
Herning